Blastobasis neniae is a moth in the  family Blastobasidae. It is found in Costa Rica.

The length of the forewings is 5.7 mm. The forewings are pale-brown intermixed with brown scales or pale-brown scales tipped with white intermixed with brown scales tipped with pale brown and a few dark-brown scales. The hindwings are translucent pale brown, gradually darkening towards the apex.

Etymology
The specific epithet is derived from Latin nenia (meaning mournful song).

References

Moths described in 2013
Blastobasis